Polyrhachis horni is a species of ant in the subfamily Formicinae. It is found in India and Sri Lanka.

References

External links
 at antwiki.org
Animaldiversity.org

Formicinae
Hymenoptera of Asia
Insects of India
Insects of Sri Lanka
Insects described in 1901
Taxa named by Carlo Emery